"New Kid on the Block" is the eighth episode of the fourth season of the American animated television series The Simpsons. It originally aired on the Fox network in the United States on November 12, 1992. After meeting his new neighbor, Laura, Bart falls in love with her, only to later discover that she has a boyfriend, Jimbo Jones, whom he attempts to scare off so that he can have a relationship with Laura. Meanwhile, Homer sues the Sea Captain Horatio McCallister after being kicked out of his all-you-can-eat restaurant while still hungry.

The episode was written by Conan O'Brien and directed by Wes Archer.

Plot
The Simpsons' elderly neighbors, the Winfields, finally relocate because of Homer's antics. The new neighbors are Ruth Powers, who is divorced, and her young daughter Laura, with whom Bart falls in love at first sight.

After seeing a television advertisement about an all-you-can-eat seafood restaurant called "The Frying Dutchman", Homer forces Marge to come with him, leaving Laura to babysit Bart and Lisa. Bart is delighted to have Laura babysitting him and attempts to impress her. But later—to Bart's dismay—she tells him that she is dating Jimbo Jones, one of the bullies from his school. When Laura, babysitting, invites Jimbo over to the Simpson household, Bart, in an attempt to break them up, prank-calls Moe's Tavern, giving his name as "Jimbo Jones", and giving Moe the Simpsons' address. Believing Jimbo is the one who has been pranking him all the time, Moe rushes to the Simpson house brandishing a large, "rusty and dull" kitchen knife. He finds Jimbo, who bursts into tears and begs for his life; Moe spares him. Laura breaks up with Jimbo for not being the tough "outlaw" she thought. She tells Bart that she would certainly date him if he were older, and the episode ends with the pair laughing after prank-calling Moe again.

Meanwhile, at the restaurant Homer quickly enrages the Sea Captain, devouring nearly all the food in the buffet, and is eventually hauled out before he has finished. Enraged, Homer sues the restaurant for false advertising, as the ad that he heard on the television prior to the incident claimed that it was "All You Can Eat", despite Homer still not being full. Homer hires Lionel Hutz to represent him in court and the case is successful after Hutz convinces the overweight jurors that a similar buffet mishap could befall them. To avoid further legal trouble, the Sea Captain and Homer eventually strike a deal together that Homer shall be displayed in the restaurant as "Bottomless Pete: Nature's Cruelest Mistake" to draw in more customers and offset the cost of his eating, much to Marge's embarrassment.

Production

The episode was written by Conan O'Brien and directed by Wes Archer. The episode's original subplot was intended to include American actor and comedian Don Rickles as a guest star presenting a comedy show and Homer laughing excessively at his jokes, until Rickles ridicules him. The pair were intended to start fighting and end up having to go to court. Despite O'Brien and other production staff being sure that Rickles would appear in the episode, he was reportedly upset by the concept of the storyline, as he did not wish to be portrayed as a "mean guy".

When attending a Fox Broadcasting Company publicity event in New York City with Rupert Murdoch, show producer Matt Groening was introduced by Murdoch to Rickles. Rickles began shouting at Groening, accusing him of spying on his Las Vegas act and using material from that for the episode. The cast actually had been receiving recordings from Rickles from the 1950s to use as ideas on how to get the style for his animatic portrayal. Another side story the writers produced was for Homer to become an outstanding barber and hair dresser, but this was not used until the season 22 episode "Homer Scissorhands".

"New Kid on the Block" features first time appearances from Laura Powers, Ruth Powers, and The Sea Captain. Hank Azaria based the Sea Captain's voice on that of actor Robert Newton.

Cultural references 
The title is a standard phrase, but also plays on the name of a boy band, New Kids on the Block. The courtroom scene in which numerous sacks of letters to Santa Claus are delivered to court is a parody of the 1947 film Miracle on 34th Street. Hunks, the game show Homer is watching at the beginning of the episode, is a parody of Studs. The music playing while the moose eats the Simpsons' garbage is a reference to the TV show Northern Exposure.

Reception

Critical reception
In 1998, TV Guide included it in its list of the top twelve Simpsons episodes.

Warren Martyn and Adrian Wood, the authors of the book I Can't Believe It's a Bigger and Better Updated Unofficial Simpsons Guide, commented that it was "a fun episode, introducing the Powers family [and featuring] the last appearance of the Winfields".

Ratings
In its original broadcast, "New Kid on the Block" finished 23rd in ratings for the week of November 9–16, 1992, with a Nielsen rating of 14.4, equivalent to approximately 13.4 million viewing households. It was the highest-rated show on the Fox network that week, beating Beverly Hills, 90210.

References

External links

 
 

The Simpsons (season 4) episodes
1992 American television episodes
Works by Conan O'Brien